Mira Bhaindar Assembly constituency  is one of the 288 Vidhan Sabha (Legislative Assembly) constituencies of Maharashtra state in western India.

Overview
Mira Bhayandar constituency is one of the 18 Vidhan Sabha constituencies located in Thane district. It comprises part of the Mira-Bhayandar Municipal Corporation and part of Thane tehsil of the district.

Mira Bhayandar is part of Thane Lok Sabha constituency along with five other Vidhan Sabha segments, namely, Kopri-Pachpakhadi, Ovala-Majiwada, Thane, Airoli and Belapur in Thane district.

Members of Legislative Assembly

Election results

2019

2014

See also
 Mira-Bhayandar
 List of constituencies of Maharashtra Vidhan Sabha

References

Assembly constituencies of Thane district
Mira-Bhayandar
Assembly constituencies of Maharashtra